The National Police Commissioner of Sweden is the head of the Swedish Police Authority, appointed by the Government, responsible for all activities of the police. The current Commissioner is Anders Thornberg, who began serving February 15, 2018.

Role
The office was created with the establishment of the National Police Board and the nationalization of the Swedish police in 1965. The Commissioner is appointed by the Government for a period of six years, with an option to extend, but as a rule for no more than three years. The person holding the office must be a Swedish citizen. Beyond that, the Government has considerable latitude in the recruitment of a new Commissioner, as the only legal framework is a single article in the constitution, leaving wide room for interpretation: "Appointments to posts at administrative authorities [organized] under the Government are made by the Government [...] When making appointments to posts within the State administration, only objective factors, such as merit and competence, shall be taken into account." The government has the power to dismiss a Commissioner for "extraordinary" and serious reasons, or if it's "in the nation's best interest." The Commissioner may also be reassigned to a different post, if called for due to organizational change, but only after a court decision.

List of National Police Commissioners 
The current Commissioner is Dan Eliasson, a lawyer and civil servant, whose appointment was announced by Minister for Home Affairs Anders Ygeman in November 2014, and began employment on January 1, 2015. He had previously served as Director-General of the Swedish Social Insurance Agency and State-Secretary in the Ministry of Justice.

List of commissioners
The following lists commissioners in chronological order:
 Carl Persson (1964 – 1978)
 Holger Romander (1978 – 1987)
 Nils Erik Åhmansson (January, 1988 – October, 1988)
 Björn Eriksson (1988 – 1996)
 Sten Heckscher (1996 – 2004)
 Stefan Strömberg (2005 – 2007)
 Bengt Svenson (2008 – 2014)
 Dan Eliasson (2014 – 2018)
 Anders Thornberg (2018 – present)

Notes

References

See also 
 Prosecutor-General of Sweden
 Supreme Commander of the Swedish Armed Forces

External links
 Official website

Law enforcement in Sweden
Heads of Swedish State agencies